Guava moth may refer to:
 Argyresthia eugeniella, found in Florida
 Coscinoptycha improbana, the Australian guava moth, found in Australia, New Caledonia and New Zealand
 Ophiusa disjungens, found in south-east Asia and the south Pacific

Insect common names